East Berkshire is an unincorporated village in the town of Berkshire, Franklin County, Vermont, United States. East Berkshire had a post office until February 14, 2004; it still has its own ZIP code, 05447.

References

Unincorporated communities in Franklin County, Vermont
Unincorporated communities in Vermont